Santa Lucía or Santa Lucia is a locality located in the municipality of Valle de Hecho, in Huesca province, Aragon, Spain. As of 2020, it has a population of 5.

Geography 
Santa Lucía is located 98km north-northwest of Huesca.

References

Populated places in the Province of Huesca